The Kanayama Dam (金山ダム） is the only Hollow Concrete Gravity dam in Hokkaidō, Japan.  The dam was constructed for the purposes of flood control and water use (irrigation, water supply, and hydro electric power generation).  The dam produces anywhere from 12,000kW to 25,000kW of hydro electric power.

References 

Dams in Hokkaido
Dams completed in 1967